Muzaffer Hussain (20 March 1940 - 14 February 2018) was an Indian writer, journalist and columnist. He was born in Bhopal, Madhya Pradesh and later moved to Mumbai in his youth for earning livelihood. He wrote columns in various newspapers and magazines in Hindi and Urdu. For over 12 years he published under the column Padsaad in the Marathi newspaper Saamana along with few articles in Hindi version as well. He was noted to be nationalist and pro-Hindutva and wrote critical about various Islamic traditions like triple talaak. In 2002, he was presented with Padma Shri, India's 4th highest civilian honour. In 2014, the Government of Maharashtra honoured his lifelong contributions with Lokamanya Tilak Jeevan Gaurav Award.

Books 
 Islam Aur Shakahar, (2007) Prabhat Prakashan 
 Khatre Alpsankhyakwad Ke, (2008) Prabhat Prakashan 
 Muslim Manasshastra
 Dango Me Jhulsi Mumbai
 Islam Dharmatil Kutumb Niyojan
 Laden
 Dahshadwaad Aani Afghanistan
 Samaan Naagri Kayada

References 

Recipients of the Padma Shri in literature & education
1940 births
2018 deaths
Indian male journalists
Indian columnists
Journalists from Maharashtra